Barbara Stanwyck (born Ruby Catherine Stevens, 1907–1990) was a prolific American actress and dancer who appeared in a total of 95 theatrically released full-length motion pictures. Orphaned before she was old enough to attend school, she became fascinated by the burgeoning film industry, and actress Pearl White in particular, whom she would mimic on the playgrounds. "Pearl White was my goddess, and her courage, her grace and her triumphs lifted me out of this world."

She began her show business career as a teenage chorus girl in speakeasy nightclubs where the liquor prohibition laws were ignored, and the clientele were often mafia gangsters. At age of 15 she danced in the El Fey Nightclub in Manhattan, operated by Texas Guinan whose establishments showcased aspiring talent such as dancers George Raft and Ruby Keeler. Biographer Dan Callahan opined that the same tough fortitude it took for a teenager to survive those experiences, was played out in the on-screen persona of her interpretation of determined and often hard-edged women. 

By age of 16, she was performing in the more mainstream-acceptable Ziegfeld Follies. It was during this period that she became acquainted with playwright Willard Mack, who gave her a role in his stage production The Noose, and re-named her after actress Jane Stanwyck. During her run in the play Burlesque, her first leading role, she also appeared in advertisements for personal exercise equipment.

Stanwyck got an uncredited bit part in the silent lost film Broadway Nights (1927). Studio executive Joseph M. Schenck subsequently signed her for The Locked Door (1929) with Rod La Rocque. Afterwards, she had a role in Mexicali Rose (1929) for Columbia Pictures. Stanwyck got her major break when director Frank Capra chose her for the lead role in his romantic drama Ladies of Leisure (1930). She would go on to make four more films with Capra: The Miracle Woman (1931), Forbidden (1932),  The Bitter Tea of General Yen (1933) and Meet John Doe (1941). She also did five films with director William A. Wellman:  Night Nurse (1931), The Purchase Price (1932), So Big! (1932), The Great Man's Lady (1942) and Lady of Burlesque (1943). She starred in the 1947 film, “The Two Mrs. Carrolls” with Humphrey Bogart (directed by Peter Godfrey). Stanwyck was nominated four times for the Academy Award for Best Actress, but never won. In 1982, she was given an honorary Academy Award. 

On August 3, 1936, Stanwyck made the first of her 16 appearances on LUX Radio Theatre hosted by director-producer Cecil B. DeMille. Her final performance with the radio series was in 1943. She had a decades-long social relationship with actress and comedian Mary Livingstone and her husband  Jack Benny, appearing on his radio show numerous times, and making her television debut on his show. In the 1950s she began to branch out into television. She received the 1961 Primetime Emmy Award for Outstanding Lead Actress – Drama Series for The Barbara Stanwyck Show anthology series. She was nominated for the same award three more times – 1966, 1967 and 1968 – for her series The Big Valley, winning it for that series only in 1966.

Stanwyck received a star on the Hollywood Walk of Fame on February 8, 1960.

Stage

Screen

Academy Awards 
Stanwyck was nominated for the Best Actress Academy Award four times. She never won, but received an honorary award in 1982, "for superlative creativity and unique contribution to the art of screen acting".

Radio

Lux Radio Theatre
	
Stanwyck made 16 appearances on LUX Radio Theatre hosted by Cecil B. DeMille, from August 3, 1936 through 1943. 
She appeared in the following episodes:

"Main Street"
"Stella Dallas"
"These Three"
"Dark Victory"
"Morning Glory"
"So Big"
"Wuthering Heights"
"Only Yesterday"
"Remember The Night"
"Smilin' Through"
"The Lady Eve"
"Penny Serenade"
"Ball of Fire"
"This Above All"
"The Gay Sisters"
"The Great Man's Lady"

Jack Benny's radio and television programs

Stanwyck and her husband Robert Taylor were part of the inner social circle of  Mary Livingstone and Jack Benny. She often appeared on Benny's radio program, sometimes in a parody of her own movies, and made her television debut on The Jack Benny Program weekly television show in 1952. The following is a sample listing of episodes in which she appeared with Benny.

Radio
"Golden Boy" (January 7, 1940)

"Dennis Wants a Raise" (November 28, 1943)

"Dennis Dreams He Has a Radio Program" (March 19, 1944)

"Jack Takes Two Cadets to Barbara Stanwyck's House " (October 1, 1942)

"Sorry, Wrong Number" (October 17, 1948)

"Dennis Dreams He's a Star " (April 10, 1949)

TV
Episode – "Gas Light" – January 27, 1952; episode repeated January 11, 1959

Television

Bibliography

References

External links
 
 
 

Actress filmographies
American filmographies
Academy Honorary Award recipients